Izari is a village located in Jaunpur district of Uttar Pradesh, India.

Demographics
According to the 2011 Indian Census the village has a population of 3,702, 1,884 males and 1,818 female.

References

Villages in Jaunpur district